E3 ubiquitin-protein ligase MARCH2 is an enzyme that in humans is encoded by the MARCH2 gene. It is a member of the MARCH family of E3 ligases, and plays an important role in the turnover of membrane proteins. MARCH2 has been shown to negatively regulate NF-κB essential modulator function upon viral and bacterial infections.

Gene name error in Excel 

Like the other MARCH and septin genes, care must be exercised when analyzing genetic data containing the MARCH2 gene in Microsoft Excel. This is due to Excel's autocorrect feature treating the MARCH gene as a date and converting it to a standard date format. The original text cannot be recovered as a result of the conversion. A 2016 study found up to 19.6% of all papers in selected journals to be affected by the gene name error. The issue can be prevented by using an alias name such as MARCHF2, prepending with an apostrophe ('), or preformatting the cell as text.

References

Further reading